The 7th local elections were held in South Korea on 13 June 2018. The election coincided with the by-elections for the vacant seats in the National Assembly. The election was a landslide victory for the Democratic Party of Korea, the ruling party, after two successful summits with the third inter-Korean summit on 27 April and the first North Korea-United States summit in Singapore on 12 June.

Metropolitan mayors and governors
A total of 17 metropolitan mayors and governors were elected.

Candidates
Bold on the candidate's name indicates that a candidate has won as metropolitan mayor or governor.

Results summary

Bold represents incumbent re-elected.

Seoul

Incheon

Gyeonggi

Gangwon

Daejeon

Sejong

South Chungcheong

North Chungcheong

Gwangju

South Jeolla

North Jeolla

Busan

Ulsan

South Gyeongsang

Daegu

North Gyeongsang

Jeju

Metropolitan and provincial councillors 

A total of 824 Metropolitan and provincial councillors were elected.

Municipal mayors 

A total of 226 municipal mayors (municipal city, county, autonomous district) were elected.

Municipal councillors 

A total of 2,926 municipal councillors (municipal city, county, autonomous district) were elected.

See also
2018 South Korean by-elections

External links
 National Election Commission

References

2018 elections in South Korea
2018
June 2018 events in South Korea